The women's 'Individual Aero Kickboxing without Step' category involved eleven women from six countries across two continents (Europe and North America).  Each contestant went through five performances (1.5 to 2 minutes each) with the totals added up at the end of the event.  The gold medal winner was Slovenian Bianca Barada-Tapilatu, Hungary's Brigitta Gazdag claimed silver, and Italy's Laura Fiori got another bronze medal (she also won a bronze in the other individual Aero Kickboxing category).

Results

See also
List of WAKO Amateur World Championships
List of WAKO Amateur European Championships
List of female kickboxers

References

External links
 WAKO World Association of Kickboxing Organizations Official Site

Kickboxing events at the WAKO World Championships 2007 Coimbra
2007 in kickboxing
Kickboxing in Portugal